Freeman Hankins (September 30, 1917 – December 31, 1988) was an American politician and funeral director who served as a member of the Pennsylvania State Senate for the 7th district from 1969 to 1988. He also served in the Pennsylvania House of Representatives for Philadelphia county from 1961 to 1968. He was a Democrat.

Early life and education
Hankins was born in Brunswick, Georgia to Oliver and Anna Pyles Hankins. He was African-American. He attended the Friendship School in Pittsburgh, Pennsylvania, the Selden Institute, and Temple University. He graduated from Dolan's College of Embalming in 1945.

Career 
Hankins served in the Medical Corps from 1944 to 1947 and began a career as a funeral director.

He served on the Democratic Committee of Philadelphia's 6th ward and as vice-chairman of Philadelphia's Democratic Committee. He served as a trustee of Lincoln University and the Stephen Smith Geriatric Center.

He died at the University of Pennsylvania Hospital in 1988 and is interred at the Fernwood Cemetery in Yeadon, Pennsylvania.

References

1917 births
1988 deaths
20th-century American politicians
African-American state legislators in Pennsylvania
Democratic Party members of the Pennsylvania House of Representatives
People from Brunswick, Georgia
Politicians from Philadelphia
Democratic Party Pennsylvania state senators
Burials at Fernwood Cemetery (Lansdowne, Pennsylvania)
20th-century African-American politicians
African-American men in politics
United States Army personnel of World War II